Kirkintilloch East and North and Twechar is one of the seven wards used to elect members of the East Dunbartonshire Council. It elects three Councillors. The current entity was technically created in 2017 following a boundary review, but has largely the same boundaries as the 2007 Kirkintilloch East and Twechar ward, which as its name suggests encompassed the eastern parts of Kirkintilloch (neighbourhoods between the Forth and Clyde Canal and the Luggie Water, including Harestanes, Hillhead, Merkland and Waterside) and the separate village of Twechar further east, up to the boundary with Kilsyth and Cumbernauld in North Lanarkshire.

The 2017 amendments involved the addition of the Kirkintilloch neighbourhoods north of the canal / along the A803 road from the defunct Campsie & Kirkintilloch North ward with the name also altered to reflect this, although the number of representatives did not change. In 2020, the ward population was 18,251.

Councillors

Election results

2022 election
2022 East Dunbartonshire Council election

2017 election
2017 East Dunbartonshire Council election

2012 election
2012 East Dunbartonshire Council election

2007 election
2007 East Dunbartonshire Council election

References

Wards of East Dunbartonshire
Kirkintilloch